John Henry Hollar (August 7, 1922 – April 9, 1997) was an American football fullback in the National Football League for the Washington Redskins and the Detroit Lions.  He played college football at Appalachian State University and was drafted in the thirteenth round of the 1948 NFL Draft by the Chicago Cardinals.

1922 births
1997 deaths
American football fullbacks
Appalachian State Mountaineers football players
United States Army personnel of World War II
Detroit Lions players
Washington Redskins players
People from Boone, North Carolina
Players of American football from North Carolina